Ron Pardo (born May 15, 1967) is a Canadian actor and comedian. He has performed roles in over 90 animated series. On PAW Patrol, Pardo has voiced Cap'n Turbot since the first episode, and later voiced the breakout villain Mayor Humdinger as well as various other characters. Pardo is also known for playing a wide variety of celebrities on the sketch comedy series History Bites.

Early life
Pardo was raised in Pardoville, Ontario (named after his ancestors), a small farming hamlet near Chatham. He went to school in nearby Blenheim, and later studied radio and television at Ryerson University in Toronto, followed by working on-air and as a copywriter at CFCO Radio. Pardo later attended the University of Western Ontario in London to study education and worked as a teacher for 12 years in Cambridge, Ontario.

Career
Ron Pardo realized early on that he had a talent for mimicry, first of cartoon characters and later of celebrities. In 1994, he started performing stand-up comedy, and in 1995, he resigned his teaching position, having won Yuk Yuk's Search for Canada's Funniest New Comic Award.  He headlined at comedy clubs and corporate events for several years.

In 1997, Pardo came to the attention of Rick Green, former member of The Frantics. Green hired Pardo to perform several characters for the pilot of Rick's new show History Bites. Pardo starred on the show for five seasons, plus several specials, receiving ensemble cast Gemini Award nominations in 2000, 2005, and 2008.

Pardo provides the voices of Cap'n Turbot and Mayor Humdinger in PAW Patrol, Maxum Man in Sidekick, Newton in later episodes of Ned's Newt, and Rupert McKenzie in Bob & Doug, for which he received a 2010 ACTRA outstanding voice performance nomination.

He also voices the title character "Quest" in the Teletoon animated TV series World of Quest, along with the voice of his sidekick, Graer. Pardo plays many characters, such as Hal-G, in the Spin Master animated series Bakugan Battle Brawlers.

His other animated voice work includes roles in Almost Naked Animals, Wishfart, Totally Spies, Carl², Braceface, and Ace Ventura: Pet Detective.

Filmography

Awards and nominations

References

External links
Ron Pardo

1967 births
Living people
Canadian comedy writers
Canadian impressionists (entertainers)
Canadian male comedians
Canadian male film actors
Canadian male television actors
Canadian male voice actors
Male actors from Ontario
People from Chatham-Kent
University of Western Ontario alumni